The Templar Salvation is a 2010 novel by Raymond Khoury, and the sequel to his debut work The Last Templar. The novel features the characters of FBI agent Sean Reilly and archaeologist Tess Chaykin, who were also the main characters in The Last Templar.

Backstory
Constantinople, A.D. 1203: As the rapacious armies of the Fourth Crusade lay siege to the city, a secretive band of Templars infiltrate the imperial library. Their target: a cache of documents that must not be allowed to fall into the hands of the Doge of Venice. They escape with three heavy chests, filled with explosive secrets that these men will not live long enough to learn. The knights reach a monastery in the Cappadocia region of present-day Turkey, where they are poisoned by the Christian monks. About a hundred years later, another Templar knight named Conrad starts searching for the missing knights and their chests. Ultimately, he finds the chests and with the help of his two brethren, he tries to escape from the region, but is attacked by a corrupt local antiques broker. His two partners are killed, but he is saved by Maysoon, the daughter of his attacker, and together they bury and hide the secrets contained in the chests.

Vatican City, present day: FBI agent Sean Reilly infiltrates the Pope's massive Vatican secret archives of the Inquisition. No one but the Pope's trusted Secondi get in-but Reilly has earned the Vatican's trust, a trust that he has no choice but to violate. His love, Tess Chaykin, has been kidnapped; the key to her freedom lays in this underground tomb, in the form of a document known as the Fondo Templari, a secret history of the infamous Templars.

References

External links
The Templar Salvation — the book's website

2010 novels
Historical novels
Christian novels